The 1974 Collegiate Commissioners Association Tournament was a single-elimination tournament of 8 National Collegiate Athletic Association (NCAA) Division I teams that did not participate in the 1974 NCAA Men's Division I Basketball Tournament or 1974 National Invitation Tournament.  It was run by the NCAA to offer berths to highly regarded conference runners-up in an effort to kill the NIT.  All games were played at St. Louis Arena in St. Louis, Missouri. Indiana defeated Tennessee, Toledo, and Southern California in that order to win the championship. Kent Benson of Indiana was named tournament MVP.

Brackets

Collegiate Commissioners
Collegiate